Dumun is an endangered Madang language spoken in Madang Province, Papua New Guinea.

Dumun is reported to go by the name Bai, but evidently this is a distinct (though related) language, or at least a variety called Bai recorded by Maclay was distinct.

References

Rai Coast languages
Languages of Madang Province
Endangered Papuan languages
Critically endangered languages